The Crown Law Office (Crown Law) (Māori: Te Tari Ture o te Karauna) is the public service department of New Zealand charged with advising the government on legal affairs, representing the government in appellate cases, and overseeing the prosecution of criminal offences before the courts.

The Office of Solicitor-General

The positions of Attorney-General and Solicitor-General were established in England in 1243 and 1461 respectively. The Solicitor General was a sub-ordinate office to the Attorney General.

New Zealand has had its own Attorney-General since 1841. The position of Solicitor-General was not established until 1867 and was initially a political office as it currently is in England. In 1875, the office became a permanent government position. Walter S Reid was the first to hold the position. He remained in the position for the next 25 years. During this period the roles and responsibilities of the Attorney-General and the Solicitor-General were the subject of some debate and clarification by the Supreme Court.

Crown Law Office
The Crown Law Office was formed to provide legal and administrative support to the Solicitor-General. Its role was mainly advisory, but did include the drafting of legislation until a separate Law Drafting Office was formed in 1907. When John W Salmond became Solicitor-General in 1910, all Crown legal work and the conduct of criminal prosecutions in Wellington became the responsibility of the Crown Law Office. The Law Drafting Office ceased to be the responsibility of the Solicitor-General in 1918 when it was given statutory recognition and became what is now known as the Parliamentary Counsel Office.

Today, the Crown Law Office operates as a government department with the Solicitor-General as its Chief Executive. The Office has more than 70 legal staff and a similar number of support staff. The scope and range of legal work undertaken has expanded to meet the full range of activities undertaken by the government in commercial, economic and social areas.

Role of Crown Solicitor
The Crown Solicitor network began in the 1920s when P S K Macassey resigned from the Crown Law Office to enter private practice. He was allowed to continue his Wellington-based criminal prosecution work. Some years later a similar arrangement was made with V R S Meredith QC, (later Sir Vincent Meredith), who later became the Crown Solicitor in Auckland.

References

External links

Law of New Zealand
New Zealand Public Service departments
1875 establishments in New Zealand